Asia Bagus! was a star-search program created by Fuji Television spanning from 1991 until 2000 to promote young up-and-coming performing artists in Asia. The show broadcast once a week throughout Indonesia, Singapore, Malaysia, Korea, Japan, Taiwan and Thailand. The prevailing champion over three shows went on to compete in a monthly run-off, while grand championships were held once a year. It was hosted by Tomoko Kadowaki and Najip Ali.

The name Asia Bagus!  was coined by a Malaysian marketing guru, Prof. Abdul Hamid Mohamed.

The winners

References

Singaporean television series
Singaporean singing competitions
Japanese reality television series
Malaysian reality television series
1990s Singaporean television series
2000s Singaporean television series
1990s Japanese television series
2000s Japanese television series
1990s Malaysian television series
2000s Malaysian television series
2000 Singaporean television series endings
1992 Japanese television series debuts
2000 Japanese television series endings
2000 Malaysian television series endings